Sangirese or Sangihe people are one of the native people to the Sangir Islands in the northern chain of islands in Sulawesi and the southern part of Mindanao. The Sangirese people are fishermen and nutmeg growers in their home areas and also work as wage labourers in industrial crops enterprises in Bolaang Mongondow Regency and Minahasa Regency.

The Sangirese have traditionally been concentrated in the province of North Sulawesi in Indonesia and the Region of Dávao in the Philippines. Genetic studies discovered that the Sangirese have partial Papuan descent.

Language
The Sangirese speak their native Sangirese, Talaud and Indonesian, as well as their dialects, which belong to the Austronesian languages family. The Sasahara language (meaning sea speech) is a secret language developed in the first half of the 20th century. It has been widely spoken among Sangirese sailors or pirates. It includes a large number of words borrowed or distorted from other languages.

History

The primary settlements of the Sangirese people are the Sangihe Islands. Archaeologists have determined that the first humans that arrived in the region of islands were in the 3rd millennium BCE and probably were a mix of Veddoids and Negritos. In 1st millennium BCE Austronesian migrant came here through the southern Philippines. They assimilated the natives, and began to developed agriculture, to produce fabrics and ceramics. Modern Sangirese people are the direct descendants of that population that has developed on Sangihe Islands before the start of the modern era.

The Sangirese people consider themselves to have originated directly from Sangir Island and their primogenitor being Gumansalangi, a cultural hero who lived around the 14th to 15th century. During this period the Sangihe Islands formed a government under the authority of the Muslim rulers of the Maluku Islands. In the 16th century, the Ternatean people subdued the Sangirese people, and the islands were discovered by the Portuguese. Then, in the 17th century, they were initially captured and became part of the Spanish colonial rule; which resulted in vocabulary borrowed from the Spanish language that is still preserved in the Sangirese language., and then followed by the Dutch who came later to occupy them in 1677. Maluku sultans also continued to consider Sangihe Islands as part of their territory.

By the 19th century, European influence was limited to trading. As Sangihe Islands were between Dutch and Spanish possessions, the local inhabitants had successfully performed the role of middleman dealers and smugglers. This led to the emergence of Sangirese settlements on Sulawesi and the southern Philippines. Sangirese resettlements in other areas of the eastern Celebes Sea were contributed by the catastrophic volcanic eruption of Mount Awu on Sangir Island on 2 March 1856. In the 19th century, presence of Protestant missionaries and increased role of colonial officers began to appear on the island.

In 1945, Indonesia gained its independence. In 1950, Sulawesi and Sangihe Islands became part of Indonesia. The first decade of the reign under the Indonesian Administration started the fight against smuggling, which involved many Sangirese people, as well as the participation of some Sangirese people in anti-government movement. In the late 1950s to early 1960s, disappointed Sangirese Indonesians took action to recreate migration to the Philippines. Migration of the Sangirese population between the two countries took place in that period.

Religion
Ancient belief systems of the Sangirese people are polytheistic in nature, which include the belief in many spirits of nature and ancestral, the ritual worship of inanimate objects and magic. Among Sangirese people are class of distinguished shamans or priests that acted as mediators between the world humans and spirits, to protect patients and children, and to perform miracles. Despite the spread of Islam and Christianity, many ancient rituals are still being practiced today.

Islam began to spread in the 15th to 16th century from the Maluku Islands and North Sulawesi; but before the arrival of Europeans, they had a very limited impact. In the 17th century, a group of Sangirese Muslims migrated to the area of Manado, which has a separate religious and ethnic group from the Sangirese people. In the 19th to early 20th century, Muslims among the Sangirese people became preachers to other Dutch colonies in Asia.

The first Christian missionaries that arrived were the Spanish Catholic monks in the 17th century, but their activity had no long-term effects. From 1857, the Sangihe Islands opened to Protestant missionaries. The majority of Sangirese people today profess Protestantism, being at the same time strongly influenced by the Minahasan people.

Today, about 79% of people of Sangihe Islands Regency profess Christianity, the majority being Protestants. Muslims comprise about 20% of the people, while the rest profess native beliefs.

Culture

Sangirese folklore is famous for its dance art. Local dances include gunde, alabadiri, masamper, ampawayer and so on. Previously, they had ritual gatherings, but nowadays it is also accompanied by public holidays. Sangirese dance represents a certain set of smooth body movements of the dancer performing the dance but organized dance of large group of dancers are usually accompanied with a musical band and female rhythmic singing.

Lifestyle and economy
Sangir people are engaged in fishing, hunting, farming (the main crops are tubers, root crops, bananas, sago) and transit marine trading between Sulawesi, Maluku Islands and the Philippines. The sources often mention the cultivation of taro culture, which was cultivated on the slopes of mountains and near rivers. To protect the cultivated fruits like coconuts from thefts, residents from Sangir hung small dolls (in Sangirese language, urǒ), which, according to legend, will "pursue a thief". Agriculture is considered to be mainly women's work. Relationship lineage and the transfer of previously inherited lands occurs in the female line. The main occupations of Sangirese men are such as ship building, seafaring and trade.

Forestry production (harvesting of rattan and ebony wood), blacksmithing and weaving were also widely spread. The economy is mainly characterized by manual labor. It is known that the main diet of Sangirese people is fish with vegetables.

The main centers of settlements of the Sangirese people are located in the coastal zones. Previously, their houses were erected on stilts, but gradually they are replaced by modern houses built like the typical Indonesian type. Families who lived in the same village, forms a community called soa. Resettled Sangirese people from Sangihe Islands seek out and continually maintain family ties with their soa; which would help them to preserve their identity in an environment similar in language and culture of their people.

Institute of marriage
In the Sangirese society; which reached a high density by the 20th century, marriage is entered relatively late. Historically, the tradition of buying a bride as an important institution of public organization. Sometimes the ransom looked like whole plots.

Notable people
 Jordi Amat, footballer
 Frans Mohede, Indonesian actor, singer and martial artist
 Mike Mohede, Indonesian singer
 Jan Engelbert Tatengkeng, Indonesian poet
 Monty Tiwa, Indonesian composer and film director

References

External links

 Suku Sangir, Sulawesi Utara

Ethnic groups in Indonesia
Ethnic groups in Mindanao